The Dean of Leighlin is based at the Cathedral Church of St Laserian, Old Leighlin in the united  Diocese of Cashel and Ossory within the Church of Ireland.

The current incumbent is Thomas W. Gordon.

List of deans of Leighlin

1603/4–1614 Thomas Tedder 
1614–1618 Randolph Barlow (afterwards Dean of Christ Church, Dublin, 1618 and Archbishop of Tuam 1629)
1618–1637 John Parker 
1637–1639 Hugh Cressy (later converted to Roman Catholicism as Serenus Cressy) 
1665/6–1668 John Nearne 
1668–1671 George Burdett 
1671/2 Samuel Burgess 
1691 or 1692 Noah Webbe 
1695/6–1723 John Francis  
1723 William Crosse 
1749–1753 Bartholemew Vigors 
1755–1764 John Featherston 
1765–1777 Charles Doyne 
1777–1778 Richard Stewart 
1778–1804 Stewart Blacker 
1804–1822 George Maunsell 
1822–1850 Hon Richard Boyle Bernard
1850–1854 Hugh Usher Tighe (afterwards Dean of Ardagh, 1854)
1854–1864 James Lyster (afterwards Dean of Ontario, 1864)
1864–1869 William Bernard Lauder
1868–1876 Francis Metcalf Watson
Philip Moore
?–1890 William Smyth King
?-?1895 Frederick Owen
1895-1912 John Finlay (murdered, 1921)
1912–1939 Joseph William Abbott
1962–1963 Henry McAdoo (Bishop of Ossory, Ferns and Leighlin, 1962)
1963–1983 Frederick Rothwell Bolton
1983–1988 Hubert Henry Ernest Peacock
1991–1996 Cecil Albert Faull
2004–2010 Frederick John Gordon Wynne
2010–present Thomas William Gordon

References

 
Diocese of Cashel and Ossory
Leighlin